Quinne Brown (born 9 June 1979) is a South African actress. She is best known for her roles in the films Ouma se Slim Kind, Sedona's Rule and This Is Charlotte King.

Personal life
Brown was born in Johannesburg, South Africa. After matriculating, she studied geography and anthropology at the University of Johannesburg.

She left for San Francisco in 2003 for her father's funeral, where she met her future husband, Ryan Huffman. She married him in 2006 and the couple lived in San Francisco. The couple later moved to San Diego, where they had their two daughters, Charlotte and Lara.

Career
During her studies, Brown got the opportunity to join the cast of the soap opera, 7de Laan. In the series, she played the popular role Connie van der Lecq. Apart from acting, she is also worked as a presenter on the SABC2 talk show. In 2003, Brown took sabbatical leave from the series after her father's death in April 2003.

She also worked in theater, film and commercials based on San Francisco. In 2008, she started teaching children at an acting school for children. After ten years in United States, she returned to South Africa with the family. In 2016, she rejoined the cast of '7de Laan', and reprised her character 'Connie'.

Filmography

References

External links
 
 7de Laan star Quinne Brown to liven things up on Just the Hits

Living people
1979 births
Actresses from Johannesburg
South African film actresses
South African soap opera actresses
South African television actresses